Eva Martincová (born 4 March 1975, in Brno) is a former Czech tennis player.

Martincová reached a singles ranking high of world number 94 in June 1997 and even ranked world number 69 in doubles during a career in which she won one WTA doubles title and a total of 17 ITF tournaments. She made three appearances for the Czech Republic Fed Cup team in the 1990s.

Junior Grand Slam finals

Girls' doubles

ITF finals

Singles (1-2)

Doubles (16–23)

References 
 
 
 

1975 births
Living people
Sportspeople from Brno
Czech female tennis players
Czechoslovak female tennis players